Ornithogalum umbellatum, the garden star-of-Bethlehem, grass lily, nap-at-noon, or eleven-o'clock lady, a species of the genus Ornithogalum, is a perennial bulbous flowering plant in the asparagus family (Asparagaceae). O. umbellatum is a relatively short plant, occurring in tufts of basal linear leaves, producing conspicuous white flowers, in a stellate pattern, in mid to late spring. The flowers open late in the day (hence some of its common names), but when closed have a green stripe on the outside. It is native throughout most of southern and central Europe, and north-western Africa. O. umbellatum is often grown as a garden ornamental, but in North America and other areas it has escaped cultivation and can be found in many areas, where it may become an invasive noxious weed. Parts of the plant are considered poisonous, but are used in some regional cuisines. Essences are also sold as patent remedies. O. umbellatum has been depicted in art by artists such as Leonardo da Vinci, and folklore has suggested it originally grew from fragments of the star of Bethlehem, hence its horticultural name.

Description
O. umbellatum is a perennial herbaceous bulbous plant (geophyte), dying back after flowering, to an underground storage bulb. The bulbs form multiple leaf-bearing bulbils that soon separate but remain close by. Initially the plant forms 6–10 basal leaves, that arise in tufts from the bulbs.

The inflorescence bears 6–20 flat star shaped flowers on ascending stems (pedicels) associated with membranaceous leaflets (bracts) in an open branching umbrella (umbel) shaped terminal cluster, described as a corymbose raceme. From the outside the closed flower appears green with white margins.

The reproductive parts consist of both male (androecium) and female (gynoecium) parts (hermaphrodite). The gynoecium has a single pistil with a superior (i. e. above the floral parts) ovary that is ovoid to obovoid, and longer than the style that extends above it. The fruit is a capsule which is oblong-ovoid with 3 sides and 6 ribs. Within it, each locule contains many seeds with a black coat of phytomelan (see Floral diagram). The species is polyploid (having more than two sets of chromosomes).

Taxonomy

Ornithogalum umbellatum has been known and described for a long time, according to some authors, as far back as Dioscorides in the first century. In 16th-century England, William Turner (1562) mentions it. In Henry Lyte's 1586 New Herbal (a translation into English of Dodoens' 1554 Cruydeboeck), reference is made to an Ornithogalum as the White Field Onion. John Gerard, in his Herball of 1597, describes Ornithogalum as the "star of Bethlem". The species known today as Ornithogalum umbellatum was first formally described by Linnaeus (1753), who is the botanical authority for the species (L.). O. umbellatum is the type species of the genus Ornithogalum, which contains about 50 species. The lectotype (reference specimen) was established by Stearn in 1983.

Etymology
The species epithet reflects the flower formation as an umbel. The plant's many common names include garden star-of-Bethlehem, sleepydick, nap-at-noon, grass lily, summer snowflake, snowdrop, starflower, bird's milk, chinkerichee, ten-o'clock lady, eleven-o'clock lady, Bath asparagus, and star of Hungary. The references to the time of day reflect the opening times of the flowers, opening late and closing at night or in cloudy conditions. The star names indicate the arrangement of the petals and bird's milk is a literal translation of ornithogalum. It has also been called dove's dung, equating it with a plant described in the bible.  The name star-of-Bethlehem is shared by a number of species of Ornithogalum, due to the white stellate flowers, and the folklore relating the flower to the biblical star-of-Bethlehem (see [[#ipc|In popular culture]]).

Distribution and habitat
A native of most of Europe, North Africa and western Asia, Ornithogalum umbellatum has been adopted as an ornamental garden plant from where it has escaped and naturalised widely in North America, where it is considered an aggressive noxious weed of lawns, gardens and no-till agricultural land, which can be difficult to eradicate. In Europe its range extends from Ireland and Portugal in the west, Italy in the south, north to parts of France and east to Turkey and the Levant.

O. umbellatum prefers damp habitats, being found along rivers, streams, and lower, wet areas of pastures. It is tolerant to shade and soil type.

Ecology

Life cycle
Ornithogalum umbellatum is thermoperiodic, requiring a cold winter to complete its life cycle. It first appears in early spring as tufts of leaves, prior to flowering (proteranthous), which occurs in late spring (May–June), the leaves fading prior to blooming. It reproduces by its bulbs, which form many offsetting bulbils that can be dispersed by water. Like many bulb plants from temperate regions, a period of exposure to cold is necessary before spring growth can begin. This protects the plant from growth during winter when intense cold may damage it. Warmer spring temperatures then initiate growth from the bulb. O. umbellatum spreads aggressively in clumps by means of these offsets.

Pollination
The flowers are insect pollinated, but may also be self-fertile, forming seeds in summer (June–July). Seed dispersal plays a relatively minor role in propagation, but accounts for isolated blooms.

Effect of light
The petals exhibit photoperiodism, often opening at noon and closing at night or on cloudy days.

Cultivation

Ornithogalum umbellatum requires considerable moisture during winter and spring, but can tolerate summer drought. It can be grown in a woodland garden as semi-shade is preferable. It is hardy to zone 5 UK, 4–9 USDA, and can become invasive. It is produced commercially as an ornamental garden plant. To control invasive tendencies, it is best to plant in a container or an edged area. O. umbellatum may be grown as an indoor plant.

Toxicity
The plant, especially the bulb and flowers, contains cardiac glycosides, specifically convallatoxin and convalloside which are toxic to humans and livestock. Symptoms of poisoning include nausea, salivation, vomiting, diarrhea, and shortness of breath, as well as pain, burning, and swelling of lips, tongue, and throat. Prolonged contact may lead to skin irritation.

Uses
Despite the known toxicities, the plant has been described as edible for 2000 years and incorporated into some traditional regional cuisines (e.g. Turkey) and traditional medicine (e.g. India). In Britain, the plant has long been the subject of herbals for its claimed culinary and medicinal properties. This includes drying and grinding the bulbs, or boiling them and baking the flowers into bread. Essences are sold as patent remedies and for aromatherapy, such as Bach flower remedies. Medical authorities advise against ingesting any part of the plant.

In history

Leonardo da Vinci drew O. umbellatum and included the plant in one of his depictions of Leda and the Swan (1508–1515), in which the flowers are held in Leda's left hand. In folklore, the biblical star of Bethlehem is said to have fallen to the earth and shattered into pieces which became the ubiquitous white flowers. Legend has also associated it with the journeys of Crusaders and pilgrims to the Holy Land.

A biblical passage in 2 Kings 6:25 relates an account of a siege in Samaria in which the desperate population consumed the excrement of doves (chiriyonim). "There was a great famine in Samaria; and behold, they besieged it, until a donkey's head was sold for eighty shekels of silver, and a fourth of a kab of dove's dung for five shekels of silver". There has been considerable discussion as to the exact meaning of this term. In notes taken by Paul Dietrich Giseke from a lecture by Linnaeus it is suggested that this Stercus Columbarum was in fact the plant Ornithogalum umbellatum, which grew abundantly in Palestine and "unde Anglis Bethlem's Star dicitur" (is known to the English as Bethlem's Star), the white colour of which resembled the excrement of birds, hence the name lac Avium (bird milk or Ornithogalum), and which was still eaten by the poor of that country.

Culturally, the flower has been associated with purity and hope, atonement and reconciliation.

In popular culture 
Naked Snake fought his mentor, The Boss, in a field full of white grass lillies in Metal Gear Solid 3: Snake Eater. In Metal Gear Solid 4: Guns of the Patriots, Arlington National Cemetery, where The Boss's and Big Boss's graves are, is also full of the flowers. In Metal Gear Solid V: The Phantom Pain, besides Snake's hospital bed, there is a vase of the flowers, when an assassin tries to kill him, the vase falls and petals float in slow motion in front of him.

References

Bibliography

Books

 see also Flora Europaea

 Historical sources

(full text at  BHL)

, see Smith's Bible Dictionary

Articles

Databases

Other websites

External links

umbellatum
Flora of Africa
Flora of Asia
Flora of Europe
Medicinal plants
Plants described in 1753
Taxa named by Carl Linnaeus